is an English contract law case relating to undue influence. It set out the basic categories of undue influence as,

(1) actual undue influence
(2A) presumed undue influence from a special relationship
(2B) presumed undue influence from readily ascertainable facts raising suspicion of undue influence

Facts
151 Farnham Lane, Slough, was in Mr and Mrs O’Brien’s names jointly. They had a £25,000 mortgage to a building society. Mr Tucker, who worked for Barclays Bank plc, when the mortgage was increased to £60,000 in 1981 made a note that Mrs O’Brien might be a problem. In 1987 Mr O’Brien’s company, Heathrow Fabrications Ltd, was not doing well and he agreed with the Barclays Woolwich branch to raise the company’s overdraft to £135,000, reducing to £120,000 after three weeks, guaranteed by Mrs O’Brien and secured on his matrimonial home with a second charge. The Woolwich branch sent a message to the Burnham branch where Mrs O’Brien was meant to sign saying to tell her of the full effects, but they did not follow instructions. Mrs O’Brien saw a document and did not read it. It said ‘obtain independent legal advice before signing this letter’ but she just signed it and was not given a copy. By November 1987 the company was doing badly. The demands for the repayments were not met and possession was sought. Mrs O’Brien argued she was unduly influenced into the contract and that she was not bound.

Judgment
The judge ordered possession, saying a misrepresentation by Mr O’Brien did not make the bank responsible.

Court of Appeal
Purchas, Butler-Sloss and Scott LJJ held that it was artificial to find undue influence when a bank ‘left it to the spouse’ (or another relation) to obtain a signature for a charge, on the basis that the spouse was acting as the bank’s agent. It held that relief would be given on the basis of a special equity in favour of wives, from Turnbull v Duval. They said she only thought £60,000 was being secured, and no more. The result was upheld by the House of Lords.

House of Lords
The House of Lords held that the contract was voidable for undue influence.

Lord Browne-Wilkinson started by setting out the policy debate. On the one hand, a more equal society had developed in which it had become usual for both husband and wife to have a title to their home on the deeds. And both should consent with open eyes to dealings in their property. On the other hand, people’s homes were an important source of security and it was vital that banks be able to take security on them. The bank would be liable to having its security set aside if it had either actual or constructive notice of undue influence. Constructive notice is when you are aware of a relationship which would put you on inquiry. It is then up to you to ensure that there is no undue influence. He noted the two categories of actual and presumed undue influence, and in the latter the complainant has to show ‘a relationship of trust and confidence… of such a nature that it is fair to presume that the wrongdoer abused that relationship in procuring the complainant to enter into the impugned transaction.’ Then the burden shifts to the other side, to show that a transaction was freely entered into, for instance ‘by showing that the complainant had independent advice. The confidential relationship can be shown either that it is one of ‘Certain relationships (for example solicitor and client, medical advisor and patient’ which in law raise a presumption or ‘the de facto existence of a relationship under which the complainant generally reposed trust and confidence…’

In a key passage, Lord Browne-Wilkinson set out the structure of undue influence.

Timing of judgment
O'Brien was technically handed down first, and in Pitt Lord Browne-Wilkinson makes reference to his "earlier" judgment in O'Brien. The composition of the judges in the House of Lords was identical in both cases.

Subsequent cases
However, notwithstanding that decision, most academic textbooks persist with the classification set out in Barclay's Bank v O'Brien.

See also

English contract law
Iniquitous pressure in English law
Lloyds Bank Ltd v Bundy [1975] QB 326
Williams v. Walker-Thomas Furniture Co. 350 F.2d 445 (C.A. D.C. 1965)

Notes

References

English unconscionability case law
English land case law
House of Lords cases
1993 in case law
1993 in British law
O'Brien